
Jürgen Brocke (4 February 1922 – 15 September 1942) was a German Luftwaffe fighter ace and recipient of the Knight's Cross of the Iron Cross during World War II. Brocke claimed 42 victories in 150 missions.  He was shot down on 15 September 1942 and was posthumously awarded the Knight's Cross on 9 December 1942.

Awards 
 German Cross in Gold on 8 October 1942 as Leutnant in the II/Jagdgeschwader 77
 Knight's Cross of the Iron Cross on 9 December 1942 as Leutnant and pilot in the 4./Jagdgeschwader 77

References

Citations

Bibliography

 
 
 

1922 births
1942 deaths
Luftwaffe pilots
German World War II flying aces
Recipients of the Gold German Cross
Recipients of the Knight's Cross of the Iron Cross
Luftwaffe personnel killed in World War II
Aviators killed by being shot down
People from Goslar (district)
Military personnel from Lower Saxony